Praga is a manufacturing company based in Prague, Czech Republic. The company produced automobiles, trucks and planes. The Praga V3S 5-ton truck was used by the Czechoslovak Army for more than half a century. The current company produces karts, racing and road supersports and is involved in car racing. It produces up to 7,000 kart chassis every year, making it one of the most successful kart manufacturers in the world.

History 

Praga was founded in 1907 to build motor cars as a venture between entrepreneur František Ringhoffer and the company 1. českomoravská továrna na stroje ("First Bohemian-Moravian Machine Works", later a founding part of the ČKD factories). Ringhoffer only stayed for one year and in 1909 the trade name Praga ("Prague" in Latin) was adopted. One of its early models was built under licence from the Italian company of Isotta Fraschini.

Besides building its own vehicles Praga later also supplied engines and gearboxes for other vehicles, like aircraft and tanks.

In 1929 Praga merged with ČKD, one of Czechoslovakia's largest engineering companies.

In 1929 ČKD's BD motorcycle was re-branded under the Praga marque. This was an advanced four-stroke single-cylinder unit construction double overhead camshaft model of 500cc designed in 1927 by JF Koch. The "BD" designation was retained as its model name.

In 1932 Praga added a second motorcycle model, the BC. This had a single overhead camshaft engine of 350cc, shaft drive and a pressed steel frame. Praga ended production of both motorcycle models in 1933.

The factory was largely destroyed by air raids in 1945. After the Second World War it was rebuilt and resumed truck and bus construction. The firm was nationalized in October 1945. Passenger cars (only the mid-sized Lady) were also manufactured in small numbers until 1947, for use by government officials.

The M53/59 Praga was a self-propelled anti-aircraft gun developed in the late 1950s. It consists of a heavily modified Praga V3S 6 wheel drive truck chassis and twin 30 mm AA autocannon.

In June 2011 the company unveiled their new race car Praga R4 at the Dutch Supercar Challenge in Belgium. It has an eight-cylinder engine of 520 hp, and has not yet been homologated for normal road traffic. According to its owner Petr Ptáček, the company is taking gradual steps, so that Praga cars will not only be seen on racetracks, but also made road-legal.

The Praga R1 from 2012 is a race car which competed in the Dutch Supercar Challenge and Britcar sports car racing.
In 2016, the company delivered the first limited edition of the supersport road car Praga R1R, a derivative of the R1 race-car. This marks the first road-legal car under the Praga brand since 1947.

Products

Automobiles

 Praga Mignon (1911–1929)
 Praga Grand (1912–1932) - limousine
 Praga Alfa (1913–1942)
 Praga Baby (1934–1937)
 Praga Piccolo (1924–1941)
 Praga Super Piccolo (1934–1936)
 Praga Golden (1934–1935)
 Praga Lady (1935–1947)
 Praga R4S (2011) - racing car
 Praga R1 (2012–) - racing car
 Praga R1R (2016–) - sports car
 Praga Bohema (planned for the second half of 2023) - sports car

All Praga automobile production stopped by 1947, but was restarted in 2011 when Praga constructed the R4S. It utilized a 3.2 liter V8 based on the Suzuki Hayabusa engine and produces 530 BHP, with a total weight of only 880 kilograms. A feature on the R4S are the markings for camber and toe, which eliminates the need of advanced tools, with a specific amount of "clicks" representing a certain degree of camber or toe.

Motorcycles

 Praga BD 500 DOHC (cs) (1929-1933)
 Praga BC 350 OHC (cs) (1932-1933)
 Praga ED 250 (1999-2003) - enduro
 Praga ED 610 (2000-2003) - enduro

Praga Trucks

 Praga N (1915-1931) - 4 ton truck (4x2)
 Praga TN - a base for Romanian ČKD TN SPE armoured car (8 built)
 Praga A150 (1947-1951) - 1.5 ton light truck (4x2)
 Praga RN (1933-1953) - 3 ton truck (4x2) 
 Praga RND (1934-1955) - modification of RN with diesel engine
 Praga RV (1935-1939) - 2 ton army truck (6x4) 
 Praga ND (1938-?) - 7 ton heavy truck (4x2)
 Praga V3S (1953-1990) - 3 ton all-terrain truck (6x6), produced around 130,000 units
 Praga S5T (cs) (1956-1974) - 5 ton truck (4x2)
 Praga UV100 (prototype 1985)
 Praga UV120 (prototype 1985)
 Praga UV80 (1992-2001) - multi-purpose medium truck (4x4)

Buses

 Praga NDO (1938-1948)
 Praga RN and RND
 Praga A150 - autobus version of the A150 truck

Trolleybuses

 Praga TOT
 Unrealized projects: Praga TNT and Praga TB 2

Light Tank

 Praga LT vz. 38 (od 1938) light tank in service with the German Wehrmacht as Panzer 38(t)
  export version of the LT to Switzerland where it was called the Panzerwagen 39.

Aircraft
 Praga BH-41 (E-41)
 Praga BH-44 (E-44)
 Praga BH-111
 Praga E-36
 Praga E-39 (BH-39)
 Praga E-40
 Praga E-45
 Praga E-51
 Praga E-55
 Praga E-112
 Praga E-114
 Praga E-115
 Praga E-117
 Praga E-141
 Praga E-180
 Praga E-210
 Praga E-211
 Praga E-212
 Praga E-214
 Praga E-241

Artillery tractors
  (1935-1941)
  (1935-1939)
  (1937-1944)
  (1937-?)
  (1937-1943)

Racing
Team Fórmula de Campeones – Praga F4 compete at the F4 Spanish Championship, a FIA Formula 4 racing championship. The first-ever running of a dedicated Praga class took at the Silverstone Circuit in April 2021 in the Britcar Endurance Championship, with seven Praga R1 racing cars.

F4 Spanish Championship results

References

External links

 Praga Company website

Automotive transmission makers
Manufacturing companies based in Prague
Aircraft engine manufacturers of the Czech Republic
Czech brands
Companies of Czechoslovakia
Car manufacturers of the Czech Republic
Bus manufacturers of the Czech Republic
Luxury motor vehicle manufacturers
Vehicle manufacturing companies established in 1907
Motor vehicle manufacturers of Czechoslovakia
Motorcycle manufacturers of Czechoslovakia